Hohenbuehelia is a pleurotoid genus of agaric fungi characterized by gelatinous-sheathed bowling-pin-shaped cystidia, on conidia, basidiospore germ tubes, and mycelium that adhere to and capture nematodes. The fruitbodies bear thick-walled cystidia (metuloids) in the hymenium along the gill sides and that differentiate the genus from Pleurotus in the Pleurotaceae family. The genus has a widespread distribution and contains about 50 species.

Etymology

Named after — Ludwig Samuel Joseph David Alexander Freiherr von Hohenbühel Heufler zu Rasen und Perdonegg (1817-1885) - an Austrian baron and cryptogamist.

Species

References

External links 
  G. Barron`& Hohenbuehelia nematode traps
 Tom Volk & ''Hohenbuehelia'

Pleurotaceae
Agaricales genera